Pak sar zamin (from Urdu, Persian "Thy Sacred Land") is the national anthem of Pakistan.

It may also refer to:
Pak Sar Jamin Sad Bad, a Bangladeshi novel based on Islamic fundamentalism.